François Cros (born 25 March 1994) is a French rugby union player. His position is back row and he currently plays for Toulouse in the Top 14.

International career

International tries

Honours

International 
 France
Six Nations Championship: 2022
Grand Slam: 2022

Club 
 Toulouse
Top 14: 2018–19, 2020–21
European Rugby Champions Cup: 2020–2021

References

External links
France profile at FFR
Stade Toulousain profile

1994 births
Living people
French rugby union players
France international rugby union players
Stade Toulousain players
Rugby union number eights
Rugby union players from Toulouse